This is a list of ambassadors of the United States to Egypt.

The United States first established diplomatic relations with Egypt in 1848, when President James K. Polk appointed Daniel Smith McCauley as the first envoy to Egypt with the title Consul General. McCauley and his family were transported to Egypt aboard the USS Constitution in 1849.

Relations between Egypt and the United States have been continuous since 1848, except for the period between 1967 and 1974. The then United Arab Republic severed relations with the U.S. following the Six-Day War; Egypt restored relations following the Yom Kippur War.

The United States Embassy in Egypt is located in Cairo. The current U.S. Chargé d'Affaires a.i. to Egypt is Daniel Rubinstein.

Ambassadors

See also
 Egypt – United States relations
 Foreign relations of Egypt
 Ambassadors of the United States

References

 United States Department of State: Background notes on Egypt

External links

 United States Department of State: Chiefs of Mission for Egypt
 United States Department of State: Egypt
 United States Embassy in Cairo

 
Egypt
United States